The 2014–15 Australian Baseball League season was the fifth Australian Baseball League (ABL) season. It was held from 30 October 2014 to 8 February 2015, with the Perth Heat winning their fourth title in five seasons, defeating the Adelaide Bite in the finals to defend their title.

Teams

Regular season

Standings

Statistical leaders

Postseason

Bracket

Preliminary Final Series

Game 1

Game 2

Composite line score
2015 ABL Preliminary Final Series (2–0): Perth Heat over Sydney Blue Sox

Championship Series

Game 1

Game 2

Game 3

Composite line score
2015 ABL Championship Series (2–1): Adelaide Bite over Perth Heat

References

External links 
The Australian Baseball League – Official ABL Website
Official Baseball Australia Website

 
Australian Baseball League seasons
Australian Baseball League
Australian Baseball League